The Mornington Peninsula is an Australian wine region located south of Melbourne, Victoria. The region has a cool climate making wine growing ideal and focuses on Pinot noir production but has had success with other varietals including Chardonnay, Pinot gris and Tempranillo. The region is known for its medium bodied, dry wines and sparkling wines that show structure and complexity. The still wine versions of Chardonnay reflect a diversity of styles, all typically oaked, from more citrus to more tropical fruit flavors.

Geography and climate
Soils differ greatly across the region, ranging from sandy flatlands around Moorooduc and Tuerong, pale brown alluvial soils at Dromana on the northern coastline to the deep russet volcanic soils between Merricks and Balnarring and the south coast. The whole region sits between 25 and 250 metres and receives an average of 350mm rainfall during the growing season.

History
The first plantings were in 1886 when wine produced from fruit planted at Dromana won an honourable mention at the Intercontinental Exhibition. An 1891 Royal Commission on Fruit and Vegetables states there were six registered vineyards in the region. By the turn of the century, economic decline, the threat of phylloxera and changing palatal preference impacted considerably on cool climate viticulture in Australia and by the 1920s these vineyards had been abandoned. The next attempt came in the 1950s when Seppelt planted  in Dromana, however, this would be destroyed by bushfire in 1967. Continuous production in the region finally began in 1972 when vines were planted at Mornington. The first commercial winery opened at Main Ridge in 1978, its first fruit was picked in 1980.

International Pinot Noir Celebration 
The Mornington Peninsula International Pinot Noir Celebration is a popular event which is held biennially since 2003 and is hosted by the Mornington Peninsula Vignerons Association (MPVA). It displays the region's capabilities at producing some of Australia's finest Pinot Noir in front of local and international audiences. In 2016, the Victorian Government announced a funding of $7500 for the expansion of the event. It has helped in benefiting pinot noir growers and wineries across the Mornington Peninsula by promoting the region in international markets, supporting export sales and wine tourism.

See also
Victorian wine
Mornington Peninsula

References

External links
 Discover Mornington Peninsula
 Mornington Peninsula Vignerons Association
 Mornington Peninsula - Tourism Victoria - Government tourism site

Australian wine
Wine regions of Victoria (Australia)
Geography of Victoria (Australia)